Yogyakarta is the capital city of Special Region of Yogyakarta and the former capital of Indonesia.

Yogyakarta may also refer to:

 Yogyakarta International Airport
 Yogyakarta Principles, a document about human rights with regard to sexual orientation 
 Special Region of Yogyakarta, a province in Indonesia.
 Yogyakarta Sultanate, a Javanese monarchy in Yogyakarta Special Region

See also